Opala may refer to:
 Opala volcano, a stratovolcano located in the southern part of Kamchatka Peninsula, Russia
 Opala, Democratic Republic of the Congo, a territory in the Tshopo Province of the Democratic Republic of the Congo
 Chevrolet Opala, a mid-size car sold by General Motors do Brasil from 1969 to 1992
 Opala (surname)

See also